Brigadier General William Kirby Lye OBE (1918-2009) was a Canadian soldier.

Education
Lye's father O. G. Lye was the officer commanding the 11th Field Regiment R.F and former mayor of Guelph, Ontario.

Career
He went overseas during the Second World War with 16th Field Company. He was later Second-in-Command of 1st Field Company. In England, he served as Chief Instructor of the Engineer Reinforcement Unit. In 1944, he served as Staff Officer Royal Engineers, Headquarters 2 Canadian Corps. BGen Lye's post-war appointments include: Deputy Commander, Canadian Forces Base Units, Middle East (United Nations Emergency Force); Commander, Camp Chilliwack and Commandant, Royal Canadian School of Military Engineering; Commander Canadian Base Units (Europe); Commander, Nova Scotia and Prince Edward Island Area; Chief of Staff, Administration, at Headquarters Mobile Command; Senior Assistant Adjutant General and Director General Ordnance Systems and Director General Land Operations in Canadian Forces Headquarters. BGen Lye retired in 1973 after his assignment as Commandant RMC in Kingston.

Honours
He was Mentioned in Despatches and appointed a Member of the Order of the British Empire for his distinguished service in 1944 as Staff Officer Royal Engineers, Headquarters 2 Canadian Corps.

Lake Lye in the Chilcotin Training Area near Williams Lake, British Columbia is named in his honour.

References

Canadian generals
Canadian Members of the Order of the British Empire
1918 births
2009 deaths
Military personnel from Ottawa
Royal Military College of Canada alumni
Commandants of the Royal Military College of Canada
Canadian Officers of the Order of the British Empire
Canadian Army personnel of World War II
Royal Canadian Engineers officers